Tracker or The Tracker may refer to:

Arts and entertainment

Fictional characters
 Tracker (G.I. Joe), in the G.I. Joe universe
 Tracker (PAW Patrol), in the animated television series PAW Patrol
 Tracker Cameron, in the television series Degrassi: The Next Generation

Films
 Tracker (1987 film), a Soviet film directed by Roman Balayan
 The Tracker (1988 film), a Western directed by John Guillermin
 The Tracker (2002 film), an Australian film
 Tracker (2011 film), a film from New Zealand
 The Tracker (2019 film), a film with Dolph Lundgren

Literature
 Tracker (comics), a five-book miniseries
 Tracker (novel), a 2015 novel set in C. J. Cherryh's Foreigner science fiction universe
 Trackers Series, a book series by Patrick Carman

Music
 Tracker (band), an indie rock band from Portland, Oregon
 The Tracker, the journal of the Organ Historical Society

Television
 Tracker (TV series), a Canadian television series starring Adrian Paul and Geraint Wyn Davies
 Trackers (TV series), a South African television series starring Rolanda Marais and James Gracie
 "Tracker" (Stargate Atlantis), a 2008 episode of Stargate Atlantis

Albums 
 Tracker (album), album by Mark Knopfler (2015)

Businesses and products
 Tracker (granola bar), manufactured by Mars, Incorporated
 Chevrolet Tracker, a compact SUV produced from 1990 until the end of the 2004 model year, and 2013 onwards
 Tracker Marine Group, a boat manufacturer

Finance
 Index tracker, or Index fund, a type of passively managed mutual fund that mimics a benchmark market index
 Tracker mortgage, a type of variable-rate mortgage

People (occupation)
Aboriginal tracker, enlisted by early European settlers and police until recently in Australia to assist in finding food and water, locating missing persons and criminals, etc. 
 Tracker, a person specializing in tracking, which involves finding and following a trail

Technology

Computing
 Tracker (business software), developed by Automation Centre
 Tracker (file manager), the file manager and desktop in the Haiku operating system
 Tracker (search software), a file indexing and file search framework
 Tracker (video analysis software), an open source video analysis and modeling tool
 BitTorrent tracker, a server that directs the BitTorrent downloads and uploads
 A piece of software used in Internet tracking
 Music tracker, a program used to sequence music using audio samples

Other 
 Tracker (mobile phone), a system for tracking the location of a mobile phone
 Tracker (vehicle), a device for tracking the location of a vehicle
 Activity tracker, a device for tracking fitness-related activities and associated measures
 Radar tracker, part of a radar system
 S-2 Tracker, a carrier-based ASW aircraft manufactured by Grumman
 Solar tracker, a device used in some solar energy applications for orienting a photovoltaic panel or reflector toward the sun

See also
 Tracer (disambiguation)
 Track (disambiguation)
 TrackR, a type of key finder
 Tracking (disambiguation)